Ricardo Florin Grigore (born 7 April 1999) is a Romanian professional footballer who plays as a centre-back for Liga I club Petrolul Ploiești.

Club career
Born in Bucharest, Grigore joined the academy of Dinamo București at age eight. On 3 April 2018, shortly before turning 19, he made his professional debut in a 1–0 Liga I away victory over Botoșani.

On 15 July 2022, following Dinamo București's relegation to the Liga II, FC U Craiova announced the signing of Grigore on a three-year contract.

On 9 March 2023, after terminating his deal with FC U Craiova, Grigore signed a contract until the end of the season with fellow Liga I team Petrolul Ploiești.

International career
In June 2021, Grigore was selected by manager Mirel Rădoi in Romania's squad for the postponed 2020 Summer Olympics.

Career statistics

Club

References

External links
 

1999 births
Living people
Footballers from Bucharest
Romanian footballers
Liga I players
FC Dinamo București players
FC U Craiova 1948 players
FC Petrolul Ploiești players
Association football defenders
Olympic footballers of Romania
Footballers at the 2020 Summer Olympics